Darryl Scott (born 9 March 1961) is an Australian cricketer. He played in four first-class and nine List A matches for South Australia between 1983 and 1990.

See also
 List of South Australian representative cricketers

References

External links
 

1961 births
Living people
Australian cricketers
South Australia cricketers
Cricketers from Adelaide